IHSS may refer to:

Honduran Social Security Institute (Instituto Hondureño de Seguridad Social in Spanish), social security in Honduras
Idiopathic hypertrophic subaortic stenosis, an older term for hypertrophic obstructive cardiomyopathy (HOCM)
International Humic Substances Society, a scientific society that seeks to advance knowledge and research of natural organic matter